Else may refer to:

Places
 Else (Lenne), a river in Germany, tributary to the Lenne
 Else (Werre), a river in Germany, tributary to the Werre

People
 Else (given name)
 Else (surname)

Music
 "Else" (song), a 1999 rock song
 The Else, a 2007 alternative rock album

Others
 Else (programming), a concept in computer programming
 , a Kriegsmarine coastal tanker

See also 

 Elsa (disambiguation)